The War Merit Cross was a military decoration of the Third Reich.

War Merit Cross may also refer to:

 War Merit Cross (Baden)
 War Merit Cross (Brunswick)
 War Merit Cross (Italy)
 War Merit Cross (Lippe)
 War Merit Cross (Reuss)
 War Merit Cross (Saxony)